Oren is a Hebrew Bible name, meaning pine.

Oren may also refer to:
 Ören (disambiguation), various Turkish places and people with the surname
 Arne Øren (born 1943), Norwegian politician
 Tommy Øren (born 1980), Norwegian retired footballer
 Oren (spy), a British First World War double agent

See also
 Orin (disambiguation)